Patrick Glendon (10 March 1895 – 22 June 1967) was an Irish hurler. Usually lining out as at corner-back, he was a member of the Kilkenny team that won the 1922 All-Ireland Championship.

Glendon had a lengthy career with Clomanto, however, he had little in terms of club success.

After being selected for the Kilkenny senior team in 1922, he was a regular member of the team at various times over the following five championship seasons. He won his first Leinster medal in his debut season in 1922 before later winning his sole All-Ireland medal after Kilkenny's defeat of Tipperary in the final. Glendon won a second Leinster medal in 1926.

Glendon was married to Johanna (née Moriarty). Prior to his hurling career he was an active member of the Old IRA during the War of Independence. Glendon died suddenly at his home on 22 June 1967.

Honours

Kilkenny
All-Ireland Senior Hurling Championship (1): 1922
Leinster Senior Hurling Championship (2): 1922, 1926

References

1895 births
1967 deaths
Clomanto hurlers
Kilkenny inter-county hurlers
All-Ireland Senior Hurling Championship winners